Namdong District (Namdong-gu) is a municipal district in Incheon, South Korea. Namdong-gu has been the city centre of Incheon since 1985. It is the location for Incheon Metropolitan City Hall, Incheon Metropolitan Police Agency main offices, the Namdong Industrial Complex, and Gil Hospital & Gachon Medical School.

Important Locations of Namdong-gu
Incheon City Hall
Incheon Central Library
The 2.68 km long Jung-Ang city park.
The Lotte department stores and nearby shopping district.
The Incheon Arts Center Grand Theater and surrounding district.
Incheon City Hall, Arts Center and Incheon Bus Terminal Subway stations.
Incheon Bus Terminal
Gil Hospital

Administrative Divisions of Namdong-gu

Guwol 1 to 4 Dong
Ganseok 1 to 4 Dong
Mansu 1 to 6 Dong
Nonhyeon-dong
Jangsu-Seochang Dong
Nonhyeon-Gojan Dong
Namchon-Dorim Dong

References

External links
Namdong-gu homepage 

 
Districts of Incheon